A Night in Vienna is a 2004 live album by Oscar Peterson.

Track listing
 Intro – 0:58
 "Night Time" – 8:35
 "When Summer Comes" – 7:10
 "Cakewalk" – 8:31
 "Requiem" – 8:49
 "Wheatland" – 9:19
 "The Backyard Blues" – 8:13
 "Satin Doll" (Duke Ellington, Johnny Mercer, Billy Strayhorn) – 9:48
 "Sweet Georgia Brown" (Ben Bernie, Kenneth Casey, Maceo Pinkard) – 8:23
 "Hymn to Freedom" – 7:56

All music written by Oscar Peterson, unless otherwise noted.

Personnel

Performance
 Oscar Peterson – piano
 Ulf Wakenius – guitar
 Niels-Henning Ørsted Pedersen – double bass
 Martin Drew – drums

References

Oscar Peterson live albums
2004 live albums
Verve Records live albums